Martine Bras (born 17 May 1978) is a road cyclist from the Netherlands. She participated at the 2012 UCI Road World Championships in the Women's team time trial for the Dolmans-Boels Cycling Team.

References

External links
 profile at procyclingstats.com

1978 births
Living people
Dutch female cyclists
People from Leerdam
Cyclists from Utrecht (province)
21st-century Dutch women